Site 109/95 at the Baikonur Cosmodrome is a missile silo built for use by the R-36 missile, which has been converted into a launch site for the Dnepr carrier rocket.

Nineteen R-36 ICBMs were launched on test flights from Site 109 between its activation in 1974, and deactivation in 1983. It was subsequently reactivated for the Dnepr programme, which uses a modified R-36 missile to place satellites into orbit. The Dnepr made its maiden flight from Site 109 on 21 April 1999. The most recent launch from Site 109 was a Dnepr, with the German TanDEM-X satellite, which was launched on 21 June 2010.

References

Baikonur Cosmodrome